The Ranson criteria form a clinical prediction rule for predicting the prognosis and mortality risk of acute pancreatitis. They were introduced in 1974 by the English-American pancreatic expert and surgeon Dr. John Ranson (1938–1995).

Usage
A score of 3 or more indicates severe acute pancreatitis. This can cause organ failure, necrosis, infected necrosis, pseudocyst, and abscess. If diagnosed with severe acute pancreatitis, people will need to be admitted to a high-dependency unit or intensive care unit.

The mnemonic "GALAW & CHOBBS" (Glucose, Age, LDH, AST, WBCs; Calcium, Hematocrit, Oxygen, BUN, Base, Sequestered fluid) can be used to help remember these criteria.

Acute pancreatitis not secondary to gallstones

At admission:
 Blood glucose > 11.11 mmol/L (> 200 mg/dL)
 Age > 55 years
 Serum LDH > 350 IU/L
 Serum AST > 250 IU/L
 WBC count > 16000 cells/mm3
Within 48 hours:
 Serum calcium < 2.0 mmol/L (< 8.0 mg/dL)
 Hematocrit decreased by > 10%
 Oxygen (hypoxemia with PaO2 < 60 mmHg)
 BUN increased by 1.8 or more mmol/L (5 or more mg/dL) after IV fluid hydration
 Base deficit (negative base excess) > 4 mEq/L
 Sequestration of fluids > 6 L

Acute pancreatitis secondary to gallstones

At admission:
 Glucose > 220 mg/dl
 Age > 70 years
 LDH > 400 IU/L
 AST > 250 IU/ 100 ml
 WBC count > 18000 cells/mm3
Within 48 hours:
 Serum calcium < 8 mg/dL
 Hematocrit decreased by > 10%
 Base deficit > 4 mEq/L
 BUN increased by > 2 mg/dL
 Sequestered fluid > 6L

Alternatives 
Alternatively, pancreatitis severity can be assessed by any of the following:
APACHE II score ≥ 8
Balthazar computed tomography severity index (CTSI)
BISAP score
Organ failure
Substantial pancreatic necrosis (at least 30% glandular necrosis according to contrast-enhanced CT)

Interpretation
 If the score ≥ 3, severe pancreatitis likely.
 If the score < 3, severe pancreatitis is unlikely

Or
 Score 0 to 2 : 2% mortality
 Score 3 to 4 : 15% mortality
 Score 5 to 6 : 40% mortality
 Score 7 to 8 : 100% mortality

References

Diagnostic gastroenterology
Emergency medicine
Medical scoring system
Medical mnemonics